Mirjana Emina Majić (born 1932) is a Croatian writer, poet and translator. She lives and works in Australia.

Biography 
She is born in Slatina, Kingdom of Yugoslavia in 1932. During the 1970s she emigrated to Australia, where she has published numerous collections of her poetry as well as contributing to anthologies of poetry in Australia and the United States. Her poetry has also appeared in Croatian-language newspapers both in Australia and overseas, including Spremnost. She was one of the contributors to Many Voices, for which she provided a short essay on Croatian poetry. She has been Secretary of the Australian Croatian Literature Society and has been a Migrant Teacher since the early 1980s.

Works 
She has written 26 works. She translated numerous works of Croatian authors in English, such as poetry collection Dubrovniče, diko (Dubrovnik, our pride) from Pavao Despot.

 Selected translations
 Croatian Word (Hrvatska riječ) – translation of an unknown author, appears in Mirrors in the Shadow
  Oh! Gospic, Our Impregnable Tower  (Hrvatska si kremen kula) – translation of an unknown author, appears in Mirrors in the Shadow
 Two Loving Homelands (Dvije domovine) – translation of an unknown author, appears in Mirrors in the Shadow and Western Galaxy

Selected poems
 Hrvatsko srdce – srdcu hrvatskome – devoted to Ante Žanetić, Croatian footballer
 I Love You (Ja ljubim te) – appears in Mirrors in the Shadow
 The Moon Is Shining – appears in The Opening of Borders

Poetry collections
 Pravaška zora svanuti mora, 1991 – devoted to The Croatian Party of Rights
 Orlovi Hrvatske: 50 obljetnica uspostave Nezavisne Države Hrvatske (en: Croatian Eagles: The 50th Anniversary of the Establishment of the Independent State of Croatia), 1991, published by the Hrvatsko Dramsko Literarno Društvo Mile Budak, – devoted to the World War II fascist puppet state called the Independent State of Croatia
 Čarobni dragulj Slavonije, 1992
 Za tobom Boko suzno moje oko, 1995
 Posavino, naša rano ljuta, 1995
 Bleiburg 1945–1995 : posvećeno 50- obljetnici Bleiburga, 1995 – devoted to the 50th anniversary of the Bleiburg repatriations
 Junak vjesnik proljeća, 1999
 Love Is a Rose, 2001
 Agony of Two Gentle Souls, 2003
 Suze roni Hrvatica vila, 2003
 Nespominjani i zaboravljen, 2009
 Sokol kliče sa Ivan Planine, 2009
 Eminin javor, 2011
 Ratnik svjetlosti, 2011

She also published prose work Hero Messenger of Spring (1995) and drama Rasplamsana vatra iz daljine (2010).

References

External links 
 List of work at AUSLit

1932 births
Living people
Australian people of Croatian descent
Croatian women poets
Croatian translators
20th-century Croatian poets
21st-century Croatian poets
21st-century Croatian women writers
20th-century Croatian women writers